John Colapinto (born in 1958) is a Canadian journalist, author and novelist and a staff writer at The New Yorker. In 2000, he wrote the New York Times bestseller As Nature Made Him: The Boy Who Was Raised as a Girl, which exposed the details of the David Reimer case, a boy who had undergone a sex change in infancy—a medical experiment long heralded as a success, but which was, in fact, a failure.

Career

Before working on staff at The New Yorker, Colapinto's articles appeared in Vanity Fair, Esquire, Mademoiselle, Us, New York and The New York Times Magazine, and in 1995 he became a contributing editor at Rolling Stone.

Writing
For Rolling Stone, Colapinto wrote feature stories on a variety of subjects including AIDS, kids and guns, heroin in the music business, and Penthouse magazine creator, Bob Guccione.

In 1998, Colapinto published a 20,000 word feature story in Rolling Stone titled "The True Story of John/Joan", an account of David Reimer, who had undergone a sex change in infancy following a botched circumcision in which he lost his penis. The medical experiment had been long heralded as a success, but was, in fact, a failure. The story, which detailed not only Reimer's tortured life, but the medical scandal surrounding its cover-up, won the ASME Award for reporting.  In 2000, Colapinto published a book-length account of the case, As Nature Made Him: The Boy Who Was Raised as a Girl. The book was a New York Times bestseller and the film rights were bought by director Peter Jackson. Reimer took his life in 2004.

Colapinto also wrote a novel, About the Author, a tale of literary envy and theft. It was published in August 2001 and was a number six pick on the Book Sense 76 list of best novels of the season; it was a nominee for the International Dublin Literary Award and for a number of years was under option by DreamWorks where playwright Patrick Marber wrote a screen adaptation. The film rights to the novel have since been acquired by producer Scott Rudin.

Colapinto's second novel, Undone, a satire hingeing on faux-incest, was published by HarperCollins Canada in April 2015. It was rejected by 41 US publishers and every publisher in Europe on grounds that it was too challenging in its subject matter. A newspaper feature story in The Globe and Mail gave an account of the novel's universal rejection in Colapinto's adopted country. A highly positive review in the Toronto Star called Undone "an equally inventive but bolder novel" than Colapinto's debut; a review in the Globe and Mail called the novel "a noir that, like Francine Prose's Blue Angel and Philip Roth's American Pastoral, details the unravelling of the moral American man and his world."

In June 2015, Colapinto spoke about the novel, and its difficult publishing history, on the CBC Radio program "q":

The novel has since been acquired by independent publisher, Soft Skull Press, a division of Counterpoint Press, based in Berkeley, California. Undone will be published in April 2016 in the United States. Trade magazine Booklist gave the novel a starred review that said: "Cannily over the top in its comic depravity and magnetizing in its sympathy, Colapinto’s battle royal of innocence and evil, blindness and illumination, betrayal and love will thrill those who enjoy subversively erotic and suspenseful fiction of the finest execution and most cutting implications."

In April 2016, The New York Times published an article, "Colapinto's Complaint," that described the novel as reviving the "male-centric literary sex novel." The article sparked a two-day tweet storm in which Colapinto was excoriated for resurrecting the "male gaze" in fiction.

As a staff writer for The New Yorker, Colapinto has written about subjects as diverse as medicinal leeches; Sotheby's auctioneer Tobias Meyer; fashion designers Karl Lagerfeld and Rick Owens; the linguistic oddities of the Pirahã people (an Amazonian tribe); and Paul McCartney. His piece on the Pirahã was anthologized in The Best American Science and Nature Writing (2008); his New Yorker story about retail loss prevention was included in The Best American Crime Reporting (2009); and his New Yorker profile of neuroscientist V.S. Ramachandran was selected by Freeman Dyson for inclusion in The Best American Science and Nature Writing.

Awards and nominations
Colapinto's Guccione story for Rolling Stone was a finalist for the ASME Award in profile writing in 2004.

ASME Award for reporting: "The True Story of John/Joan" in 'Rolling Stone.

Canadian National Magazine Award: "All the Right Moves" (about chess prodigy Jeff Sarwer and his unconventional upbringing): "Saturday Night Magazine," 1987.

Personal life
Colapinto lives in New York City's Upper East Side. He is married to Donna Mehalko, fashion illustrator, artist, and author of "Mr Wrong, a Users Guide", a humorous take on dating that recommends ways to use Mr Wrong for  maximum benefit while waiting for Mr Right; they have one son.

He plays keyboards and sings with the Sequoias, a band made up mostly of New York magazine journalists.

Bibliography

Books

Essays and reporting
 Profile of Esperanza Spalding.

Critical studies and reviews
 Review of Undone.

References

External links
 Portrait photo in The New Yorkers contributor's profile
 Colapinto staff articles in The New Yorker

1958 births
Living people
21st-century Canadian novelists
Canadian male novelists
Canadian non-fiction writers
Journalists from Toronto
The New Yorker people
The New Yorker staff writers
Writers from Toronto
21st-century Canadian male writers
Canadian male non-fiction writers
Upper Canada College alumni